Yves Yuvuladio (born 5 March 1978) is a retired footballer from DR Congo.

Yuvuladio was a member of the DR Congo squad for the 2000 and 2002 Africa Cup of Nations.

References

External links

1978 births
Living people
Footballers from Kinshasa
Democratic Republic of the Congo footballers
Democratic Republic of the Congo expatriate footballers
Democratic Republic of the Congo international footballers
2000 African Cup of Nations players
2002 African Cup of Nations players
Erzurumspor footballers
Turanspor footballers
Süper Lig players
Daring Club Motema Pembe players
Espérance Sportive de Tunis players
Hapoel Haifa F.C. players
Hapoel Ironi Kiryat Shmona F.C. players
Hapoel Petah Tikva F.C. players
Hapoel Bnei Lod F.C. players
Expatriate footballers in Turkey
Expatriate footballers in Israel
Expatriate footballers in Tunisia
Democratic Republic of the Congo expatriate sportspeople in Turkey
Democratic Republic of the Congo expatriate sportspeople in Israel
Democratic Republic of the Congo expatriate sportspeople in Tunisia
Association football defenders